Cordana johnstonii is an ascomycete fungus that is a plant pathogen. It produces cordana leaf spot on bananas.

References

External links 
 Index Fungorum
 USDA ARS Fungal Database

Fungal plant pathogens and diseases
Ascomycota enigmatic taxa
Banana diseases
Fungi described in 1971